Naukowa i Akademicka Sieć Komputerowa ("Research and Academic Computer Network") or NASK is a Polish research and development organization and data networks operator.

.PL Registry 
NASK is the ccTLD registry. While launching in 2003 a domain automatic registration system by means of EPP (Extensible Provisioning Protocol), NASK introduced the Partner Programme within the scope of registration and service of domain names. The NASK Partner Programme is a solution operating in accordance with the world recognised “Registry-Registrar” model. NASK (Registry) provides its Partners (Registrars) with the functionality of independent registering and servicing domain names in the .pl domain registry.

Each entrepreneur, meeting the technical and formal requirements specified by NASK, may become a NASK's Partner. The Partner Programme gives subscribers an opportunity to choose the most attractive offer from a number of Polish and foreign providers rendering domain name related services. Currently, over 99.9 percent of all domain name registrations are effected by NASK's Partners.

In 2003, NASK, as one of the first registries in the world, introduced the maintenance of domain names with diacritic signs (Internationalized Domain Names). Also in 2003, on the NASK's initiative, the Court of Conciliation for Internet Domains organized at the Polish Chamber of Information Technology and Telecommunications was established.
Besides domain registration, NASK offers through its Partners such services as Waiting List Service (WLS) – the so-called “option” enabling the purchase of the 3-year period of priority for registration of a domain name in case it has been deleted, or Domain Name Tasting (DNT) – a service consisting in registration of a domain name for the period of 14 days for the purpose of testing its attractiveness.

Since the end of September 2009, NASK has been cooperating with the Partners on the basis of a prepaid model, where the fee for registration is collected automatically from the Partner's account.
In order to increase the .pl domain security, since 20 December 2011 NASK has begun to implement DNSSEC (Domain Name System Security Extensions) in the production environment, and since 4 June 2012 subscribers have been allowed to forward to the .pl registry the DS records of secured domain names.

Since 1 July 2013, in accordance with the agreement concluded with IPPT PAN (Institute of Fundamental Technological Research Polish Academy of Sciences), NASK has been providing the maintenance of .gov.pl domain names.
NASK is the official representative of Poland in organizations such as FIRST, CENTR and ICANN, which in turn authorizes NASK to indirectly influence the operation of DNS.

CERT Polska 
The CERT Polska team operates within the structures of NASK. CERT Polska is the first Polish computer emergency response team. Active since 1996 in the response teams community, it has become a recognized and experienced entity in the field of computer security. Since its launch, the core of the team's activity has been handling security incidents and cooperation with similar units worldwide. CERT Polska also conducts extensive security-related R&D. In 1998, CERT Polska became a member of the international forum of response teams (FIRST), and since 2000 it has been a member of the working group of the European response teams: TERENA TF-CSIRT, accredited by Trusted Introducer. In 2005 by the initiative of CERT Polska, a forum of Polish abuse teams, Abuse FORUM, was created. In 2010 CERT Polska joined the Anti-Phishing Working Group, an association of companies and institutions which actively fight on-line crime.

Main responsibilities of CERT Polska include:
 registration and handling of network security incidents;
 active response in case of direct threats to users;
 cooperation with other CERT teams in Poland and worldwide;
 participation in national and international projects related to the IT security;
 research into methods of detecting security incidents, analysis of malware, systems for exchanging information on threats;
 development of proprietary and open source tools for detection, monitoring, analysis, and correlation of threat;
 regular publication of the annual CERT Polska Report on security of Polish cyberspace;
 informational and educational activities, aimed at raising awareness in relation to IT security, including:
 maintaining a blog at cert.pl as well as Facebook and Twitter accounts;
 organization of the annual SECURE conference
 analysis and testing of IT security solutions.

Dyzurnet.pl 
The Dyżurnet.pl team is a point of contact that has been functioning within the framework of NASK since 2005. It responds to anonymous reports received from Internet users about potentially illegal material, such as pornographic content involving a minor.

Dyżurnet.pl also carries out awareness raising and educational activities to increase the level of the online safety of children and young people by, among others, taking various initiatives, including campaigns, conferences, trainings for professionals and experts as well as workshops for the youngest Internet users.

Dyżurnet.pl operates as part of the Polish Safer Internet Centre- the European Commission’s program.

References

http://www.nask.pl
http://www.dns.pl
http://www.cert.pl
https://dyzurnet.pl
http://www.saferinternet.pl

External links
Homepage - about the organization
NASK Main Website
CERT Polska homepage
Dyzurnet.pl homepage
Saferinternet homepage
.PL Registry: List of registrars
.PL Registry: Statistics

Organizations established in 1991
Communications in Poland
Information technology companies of Poland
Science and technology in Poland
1991 establishments in Poland